USS Mendota was a steamer built for the Union Navy during the American Civil War. With her heavy guns, she was planned by the Union Navy for use as a bombardment gunboat, but also as a gunboat stationed off Confederate waterways to prevent their trading with foreign countries.

Service history
Mendota, a sidewheel gunboat, was launched 13 January 1863 by F. Z. Tucker, Brooklyn, New York; acquired by the Navy 1 February 1864; and commissioned 2 May 1864, Comdr. Edward T. Nichols in command. From the day of her commissioning in 1864, Mendota was assigned to the James River Division, North Atlantic Blockading Squadron. The first ten months she served as a picket ship near Four Mile Creek. Her guns were used to prevent the establishment of Confederate batteries or entrenchments which would threaten river communications or imperil a small Union Army base camp. Action on 28 July was particularly intense. During her last two months of service, she directed ship movements at Hampton Roads, Virginia, and also at the mouth of the Delaware River. After the war, Mendota decommissioned 12 May 1865 and was laid up at League Island, Philadelphia, Pennsylvania, until sold 7 December 1867.

References

External links 
 
 Photo gallery at Naval Historical Center

Ships of the Union Navy
Sassacus-class gunboats
Steamships of the United States Navy
Ships built in Brooklyn
1863 ships